The Daikin Goodman Texas Technology Park (initially called the Comfortplex) is a major factory and office building in Waller, Texas, United States near Houston.  Opened in 2017 as the manufacturing, logistics, and engineering center for Daikin's American subsidiary Goodman, the plant makes heating and air conditioning products sold under the Goodman, Amana, and Daikin brands (Daikin, Sekai).

With a footprint of 4.23 million square feet (393,000 square meters) under a single roof, the DTTP is the third largest factory in the United States (behind the Tesla Factory and the Boeing Everett Factory) and the fifth largest in the world.

References

External links 
Comfortplex homepage
Comfortplex Twitter page
Cooling Post coverage
Houston Business Journal coverage
Houston Chronicle coverage
Community Impact coverage
How to apply

Videos 
Daikin Campus Tour
Daikin Texas Technology Park

Science parks in the United States
Waller County, Texas
Daikin